Bunjevčević is a Serbian and Croatian surname, derived from the demonym Bunjevci. Notable people with the surname include:

Goran Bunjevčević (1973–2018), former Serbian footballer
Mirko Bunjevčević (born 1978), Serbian footballer

Croatian surnames
Serbian surnames